The Evans Grove Complex is a complex of seven giant sequoia groves located in the Kings River watershed on the southern slopes of Kings Canyon in Giant Sequoia National Monument (Sequoia National Forest). It is formed from the Evans, Lockwood, Little Boulder, Boulder, Kennedy, Windy Gulch, and Horseshoe Bend groves. The complex is home to a rich collection of old-growth giant sequoias covering a combined .

History
Evans Grove Complex derives its name from Evans Grove, the largest constituent grove, which itself is named after John Evans, who lived nearby and protected the trees from fire.

The complex and its surroundings were heavily impacted by the Rough Fire in 2015 and have since been closed by the Sequoia National Forest.

Noteworthy trees
Some trees of special note found within the complex include:
Ishi Giant — an old, fire-scarred giant sequoia with few visitors and was the 14th tallest giant sequoia in the world. A new volume and height estimate is needed to determine its size.

See also
List of giant sequoia groves
List of largest giant sequoias

References

Giant sequoia groves
Giant Sequoia National Monument
Sequoia National Forest